The brown sipo (Chironius fuscus) is a species of snake of the family Colubridae.

Geographic range
The snake is found in South America and Central America.

References 

fuscus
Snakes of South America
Reptiles of Bolivia
Reptiles of Brazil
Reptiles of Colombia
Reptiles of Ecuador
Reptiles of French Guiana
Reptiles of Guyana
Reptiles of Peru
Reptiles of Suriname
Reptiles of Venezuela
Reptiles described in 1758
Taxa named by Carl Linnaeus
Snakes of Central America